The Ferrari 735 LM (also known as the 121 LM) was a sports racing car produced by Ferrari in 1955. It was the second raced Ferrari, powered by an Aurelio Lampredi-designed inline-6 engine, created as a larger displacement evolution to the engines used in the Ferrari Monza race cars.

Development
The Ferrari 735 LM was converted from the 376 S sports car, that contested the Mille Miglia race for the 1955 season. The first example was converted before Mille Miglia, the rest after the race. Most of the specifications remained the same apart for the engine, which received a much bigger displacement and power output.

The 735 LM was developed to compete in the 1955 24 Hours of Le Mans race, that a year earlier, Ferrari had won with the 375 Plus. With lesser aerodynamics and outdated braking technology than the competition, as Enzo Ferrari had firmly believed in engine power to win at racing, the 735 LM with its new 4.4-litre engine, was designed to outpower the competitors. In the practice trial for the 24 Hours race, the 735 LM was the fastest.

Unlike its predecessor, the 735 LM name referred to the displacement of one cylinder, as was the naming convention. The models “LM” suffix invoked the intended race – 24 Hours of Le Mans. Inherited chassis numbers also had an “LM” suffix.

The 4.4-litre iteration was also the final capacity step in the inline-six model lineage. After the Le Mans disaster, the new race regulations forced a 2.5-litre cap, so Ferrari returned to the 625-engined Monza models for the 1956 season. Ferrari would also never return to the inline-six configuration and focused instead on a new V6 Dino engine.

Specifications

The enlarged engine was identified as the Tipo 121, hence the common "121 LM" name of the car. Ferrari decided to use smaller diameter carburettors on this model, compared to its predecessor. The engine used twin spark plugs per cylinder, served by two coils and had a twin overhead camshaft design to actuate two valves per cylinder. It also used a dry sump lubrication system. The compression ratio was at 8.5:1, slightly higher than before.

The tubular steel chassis identified as the Tipo 509 was the same as on the 376 S predecessor. The whole car weighed only  when unladen. The fuel tank had 150-litres capacity.

The front suspension was independent with unequal-length wishbones. Coil springs with hydraulic shock absorbers were also mounted at the front. Suspension at the rear consisted of a De Dion axle with twin arms and transverse leaf spring helped by hydraulic shock absorbers. The cars were still not upgraded to, available at that time, disc brakes and used drums instead.

Racing

The first example of the 735 LM series raced in the 1955 Mille Miglia among smaller capacity 376 S and Monza siblings. Eugenio Castellotti entered the race as a privateer, but had to retire due to an engine problems.

For the 1955 24 Hours of Le Mans, Scuderia Ferrari entered three cars. Umberto Maglioli and Phil Hill drove the car no. 3. Eugenio Castellotti with Paolo Marzotto raced in the car no.4, and Maurice Trintignant and Harry Schell duo were fielded as number 5. The 735 LM was entered in the top ‘Sport 5.0’ category. It was the category that also included the Jaguar D-Type, Lagonda DP-166 and Cooper T38. Castellotti in the Ferrari no. 4, recorded the best practice lap time of all time at 4min 14sec. Only a second slower was the Mercedes-Benz 300SLR  of Juan Manuel Fangio. Also over the flying kilometre on the Mulsanne straight, the 735 LM recorded an impressive top speed of 291.2 km/h. Second was the Jaguar D-Type at 281.9 km/h.
The actual race was much more disappointing for Ferrari as none of the fielded cars had finished the race. First, the car of Castellotti / Marzotto retired after 52 laps and five hours, with a broken engine. After the seven hour mark and covering only 76 laps, Maglioli and Hill fell out of the race with an overheating engine and clutch problems. Finally the last of the Ferrari entries, can no. 5 with Trintignant and Schell, retired with a faulty clutch after 107 laps and 10 hours of racing.
The race itself remained a black card in the history of motorsport because of the catastrophic crash that occurred, which came to be known as the 1955 Le Mans disaster.

Still in 1955, Umberto Maglioli entered the Aosta-Gran San Bernardo hillclimb and scored a first place overall. Later the same year, two cars were entered in the Swedish Grand Prix for sports cars. One finished third, driven by Eugenio Castellotti. The second, entered by Hawthorn, did not start.

After the failed Le Mans and imposition of the capacity caps for the 1956 season, all four cars ended up in the States. Between 1955–1963 cars were raced by Jim Kimberly, Carroll Shelby, Phil Hill, Ray Cherryholmes, John Kilborn and Ernie McAfee with many victories in the SCCA and other race series in the US. McAfee, Shelby and Cherryholmes scored the most victories of all 735 LM drivers.

In April 1956, during the Del Monte Trophy in Pebble Beach, California, a fatal accident occurred in which Ernie McAfee lost his life. His car hit a tree and he was killed on impact. This event caused a ban of racing in Pebble Beach.

In 1957, three 735 LMs were entered in the Cuban Grand Prix. Two had retired and one had not arrived at all.

Collectability
Only fours cars were made and all are in the hands of avid Ferrari collectors. The s/n 0546LM was sold in 2017 on RM Sotheby's auction for US$5.72 million.

References

Bibliography

External links

Ferrari 735 LM: Ferrari History

735 LM
Sports racing cars